Kiwayu Airport  is an airport serving Kiwayu (also spelled Kiwayuu), a small island in the eastern part of the Lamu Archipelago off the coast of Kenya. The airstrip is located on the mainland, adjacent to the northern tip of Kiwayu Island. This location lies in Lamu District, Coast Province, on the western shores of the Indian Ocean.

Overview
The airport is a small-sized airport that serves the island of Kiwayu and surrounding communities.

Airlines and destinations

See also
 Kiwayu
 Lamu District
 Lamu Archipelago
 Coast Province
 Kenya Airports Authority
 Kenya Civil Aviation Authority
 List of airports in Kenya

References

External links
 Location of Kiwayu Airport At Google Maps
  Website of Kenya Airports Authority
  Airkenya Flight Routes
 

Airports in Kenya
Coast Province
Lamu Archipelago
Lamu County